The Balloon Vendor (also released as Last Moments and The Last Circus Show) is a 1974 Italian drama film directed by Mario Gariazzo and starring James Whitmore.

Cast
 Renato Cestiè as Giacomino
 Lee J. Cobb as Vent'anni 
 Adolfo Celi as Professor
 James Whitmore as Antonio
 Cyril Cusack as Balloon Vendor
 Marina Malfatti as Maria
 Silvano Tranquilli as Doctor
 Gianni Agus as Circus manager
 Umberto D'Orsi as Taxi Driver
 Maurizio Arena as Romolo
 Lina Volonghi as Sister Maria

References

External links

1974 films
1974 drama films
Italian drama films
1970s Italian-language films
Films directed by Mario Gariazzo
Films scored by Stelvio Cipriani
1970s Italian films